The boys' pursuit competition of the biathlon events at the 2012 Winter Youth Olympics in Innsbruck, Austria, was held on January 16, at Seefeld Arena. 50 athletes from 30 different countries took part in this event. The race was 10 km in length.

Results
The race was started at 14:30.

References

Biathlon at the 2012 Winter Youth Olympics